Collick is a surname. Notable people with the surname include:

Bill Collick (born  1951), American football and wrestling coach and college athletics administrator
Percy Collick (1897–1984), British politician and trade union official